Leo Moyo (K'Millian) is a Zambian R&B artist born on April 12, 1974. His most popular hits are ulebukisha" do you remember?"Kakabalika" ('The Sun Will Shine Again) - a song which tells the story of a pregnant woman who is abandoned, "Pa Ulendo" - a song praising a woman for her prayers and thoughts as he makes a journey to see her, "Nizakukonda", "Another Day" and "Uleibukisha". His album "Another Day" spent over 21 weeks as no. 1 in the Zambian charts, whilst "Kakabalika" spent more than 14 weeks at no. 1 on the Radio Phoenix Local Rhythmz Countdown.

He launched a new album called "True Colors" on 21 December 2007.
K'millian   toured Perth, Australia and performed at the Burswood casino ballroom to masses of Zambian fans that had attended the show.He has worked with many foreign acts.

References 
 K'Millian Records Song With Ugandan Artist

External links
 All K'Millian Music on ZambianMusic.net
 K'Millian With Ugandan Artist
 Official Myspace
 Buy "Another Day" from CD Baby

21st-century Zambian male singers
Living people
People from Lusaka
1974 births